There have been seven baronetcies created for persons with the surname Powell, five in the Baronetage of England and two in the Baronetage of the United Kingdom. Only one creation is extant as of 2007.

The Powell Baronetcy, of Pengethly in the County of Hereford, was created in the Baronetage of England on 18 January 1622 for Edward Powell. The title became extinct on his death in 1653.

The Powell Baronetcy, of Birkenhead in the County of Chester, was created in the Baronetage of England on 29 January 1629 for Thomas Powell. The title became extinct on the death of the second Baronet in c. 1700.

The Powell Baronetcy, of Pengethly in the County of Hereford, was created in the Baronetage of England on 23 January 1661 for William Powell, Member of Parliament for Herefordshire. The title became extinct on his death in 1680.

The Powell Baronetcy, of Ewhurst in the County of Sussex, was created in the Baronetage of England on 10 May 1661 for Nathaniel Powell. The fourth Baronet represented Kent in the House of Commons. The title became extinct on his death in 1742.

The Powell Baronetcy, of Broadway in the County of Carmarthen, was created in the Baronetage of England on 19 July 1698 for Thomas Powell, Member of Parliament for Monmouth and Carmarthenshire. The title became extinct on the death of the second Baronet in 1721.

The Powell Baronetcy, of Horton Old Hall in the County of York, was created in the Baronetage of the United Kingdom on 15 June 1892 for Francis Powell, who represented Cambridge, the West Riding of Yorkshire North and Wigan in the House of Commons as a Conservative. The title became extinct on his death in 1911.

The Powell Baronetcy, of Wimpole Street in St Marylebone in the County of London, was created in the Baronetage of the United Kingdom on 5 March 1897 for Richard Powell, Physician-in-Ordinary to Queen Victoria, Edward VII and George V and President of the Royal College of Physicians. The family surname is pronounced "Poel".

Powell baronets, of Pengethly (1622)

Sir Edward Powell, 1st Baronet (–1653)

Powell baronets, of Birkenhead (1629)

Sir Thomas Powell, 1st Baronet (died 1647)
Sir Thomas Powell, 2nd Baronet (1631–)

Powell baronets, of Pengethly (1661)
Sir William Powell, 1st Baronet (–1680)

Powell baronets, of Ewhurst (1661)

Sir Nathaniel Powell, 1st Baronet (died 1675)
Sir Nathaniel Powell, 2nd Baronet ( –)
Sir Nathaniel Powell, 3rd Baronet (–1708)
Sir Christopher Powell, 4th Baronet (–1742)

Powell baronets, of Broadway (1698)
Sir Thomas Powell, 1st Baronet (–1720)
Sir Herbert Powell, 2nd Baronet (–1721)

Powell baronets, of Horton Old Hall (1892)
Sir Francis Sharp Powell, 1st Baronet (1827–1911)

Powell baronets, of Wimpole Street (1897)
Sir Richard Douglas Powell, 1st Baronet (1842–1925)
Sir Douglas Powell, 2nd Baronet (1874–1932)
Sir Richard George Douglas Powell, 3rd Baronet (1909–1980)
Sir Nicholas Folliott Douglas Powell, 4th Baronet (1935–2019)
Sir James Richard Douglas Powell, 5th Baronet (born 1962)

References

Kidd, Charles, Williamson, David (editors). Debrett's Peerage and Baronetage (1990 edition). New York: St Martin's Press, 1990.

 

Baronetcies in the Baronetage of the United Kingdom
Extinct baronetcies in the Baronetage of England
Extinct baronetcies in the Baronetage of the United Kingdom
1622 establishments in England